The German Orthographic Conference of 1901 (the Berlin II Orthographic Conference;  or ) took place in Berlin from 17 until 19 June 1901. The results of the conference became official in the German Empire in 1902. 
The standardized German spelling that resulted from the conference was largely based on the Prussian school spelling, but also on the Orthographic Conference of 1876.

The conference results removed numerous existing variant forms.
Soon after the conference, its results were criticized by people who believed there should be further changes.

The spelling was used in Germany, Austria and Switzerland, apart from the replacement of ß with ss in Switzerland in later years.
The Erziehungsrat des Kantons Zürich stopped the teaching of ß in schools in 1935 with the Kanton Zürich being the first to do so, and the Neue Zürcher Zeitung as last Swiss newspaper stopped using ß in 1974. However, some Swiss book publishers still use ß.

It was not until 95 years later that the German spelling was changed with a reform in 1996.

Encoding
The IETF language tags have registered  for "Traditional German orthography".

References

German orthography reforms